The Turnen is a mountain of the Bernese Alps, overlooking Zwischenflüh in the Bernese Oberland. It lies in the range between the Simmental and the Diemtigtal.

References

External links
 Turnen on Hikr

Mountains of the Alps
Two-thousanders of Switzerland
Mountains of the canton of Bern
Mountains of Switzerland